East of Midnight is Canadian musician Gordon Lightfoot's 17th original album, released in 1986 on the Warner Bros. Records label. The album reached #165 on the Billboard 200.

Lightfoot enlisted keyboardist and producer David Foster on the song "Anything for Love", which reached #13 on the Adult Contemporary chart and #71 on the Country chart.

Track listing
All compositions by Lightfoot except as indicated.
"Stay Loose" – 3:53
"Morning Glory" – 3:24
"East of Midnight" – 3:58
"A Lesson in Love" – 4:05
"Anything for Love" – 3:43 (Lightfoot, David Foster)
"Let it Ride" – 3:40
"Ecstasy Made Easy" – 4:05
"You Just Gotta Be" – 3:34
"A Passing Ship" – 3:55
"I'll Tag Along" – 3:08

Personnel 
 Gordon Lightfoot - main vocals, guitar 
 Lenny Castro - percussion 
 Vern Dorge - alto saxophone, tenor saxophone 
 David Foster - synthesizer, keyboards
 Mike Heffernan - keyboards 
 James Newton Howard - synthesizer, percussion, keyboards 
 Sheree Jeacocke - harmony vocals 
 Barry Keane - percussion, drums 
 Michael Landau - guitar 
 Bob Mann - guitar, rhythm guitar 
 Richard Marx - harmony vocals 
 Lou Pomanti - Hammond organ 
 Tom Szczesniak - synthesizer, bass, keyboards 
 Vesta Williams - harmony vocals

References
Review

External links
Album lyrics and chords

1986 albums
Gordon Lightfoot albums
Albums produced by David Foster
Warner Records albums